Baillon's wrasse (Symphodus bailloni) is a species of wrasse native to the eastern Atlantic Ocean from the British Isles and Belgium to Mauritania and the western Mediterranean Sea along the coast of Spain and around the Balearic Islands. It can reach  in standard length, though usually not exceeding . The British Record (rod caught) for the heaviest fish is 285 grams caught in Poole Bay, Dorset on 3 September 2018 by David Lynes
  It is caught for human consumption in artisanal fisheries.

References 

Baillon's wrasse
Fish of West Africa
Marine fish of Europe
Fauna of Spain
Baillon's wrasse